Natsumi Yabuuchi (薮内夏美, born 21 July 1977) is a Japanese former basketball player who competed in the 2004 Summer Olympics.

Born: Jul 21, 1977 in  Osaka

Height: 175 cm / 5.7 feet

Positions: Point Guard

Previous teams : Japan (W)

References

1977 births
Living people
Japanese women's basketball players
Olympic basketball players of Japan
Basketball players at the 2004 Summer Olympics